Celebrate You may refer to:

 "Celebrate You", song by Corbin Bleu from Speed of Light
 "Celebrate You", song by Kylie Minogue Disco

See also 
 Celebrate (disambiguation)